Alice Vianna Prestes (21 October 1887 – 9 June 1940) was the wife of Júlio Prestes, President-elect of Brazil, who was impeded from taking office due to the Revolution of 1930, fact that also impeded her from officially assuming the role of First Lady of Brazil. In the state of São Paulo, she had served as First Lady from 1927 to 1930.

Biography
Born in the state of São Paulo, daughter of Abílio Vianna and Maria Isabel de Barros Vianna, she married on 3 May 1906 with poet and lawyer Júlio Prestes de Albuquerque and they had 3 children: Marialice Prestes de Albuquerque, Fernando Prestes Neto and Irene Prestes da Silva.

Death
Vianna died on 9 June 1940, in Araras farm, municipality of Itapetininga, aged 52, where her body was buried in the Holy Sacrament Cemetery.

See also
 First Lady of Brazil

References

|-

1887 births
1940 deaths
Spouses of Brazilian politicians
First ladies of São Paulo (state)